Out of the Shallow End is the debut EP released by the American alternative metal band AM Conspiracy. All of the songs on the EP would later be re-recorded for their self-titled debut album.

The tracks "Absence" and "Far" have experienced rotation on XM Satellite Radio's SquiZZ, Europe's Kerrang!, and various FM stations across the US. Then-previously unreleased songs "Right on Time" and "Welt" were featured in the video game WWE SmackDown vs. Raw 2008.

Track listing
All tracks by Clint Campbell, Brian Diemar & Jason "Gong" Jones.

 "Absence" – 3:18
 "Far" – 3:51
 "Right on Time" – 3:23
 "Down" – 4:28
 "Welt" – 3:20

Personnel
 Jason "Gong" Jones – vocals
 Brian Diemar – guitar, programming
 Clint Campbell – guitar
 Kenny Harrelson – bass
 Dean Andrews – drums
 Rae DiLeo – co-producer, engineer

2007 debut EPs
AM Conspiracy albums